Oldřich Černý (born 1965) is a Czech politician and a member of the Chamber of Deputies for the Freedom and Direct Democracy (SPD) party. He was first elected in 2021 for the Central Bohemia region on second place on the SPD's list. He is also the deputy mayor of Kladno.

References 

1965 births
Living people
21st-century Czech politicians
Freedom and Direct Democracy MPs
Politicians from Kladno
Members of the Chamber of Deputies of the Czech Republic (2021–2025)